The Stone Quarry Bridge is a historic Pratt truss bridge which carries Township Road 1000N across the Embarras River in Coles County, Illinois, near Charleston, Illinois. The bridge is a double-intersection Pratt truss bridge, a variant of the Pratt truss in which the diagonal supports cross multiple panels; it is the only bridge of its type in the county. Built in 1883 by the King Iron Bridge Company, the bridge is the oldest truss bridge in the county as well as the oldest bridge in the county which is still open to traffic.

It is named for its propinquity to the Charleston Stone Company quarry.

The bridge was added to the National Register of Historic Places on November 30, 1981.

References

Road bridges on the National Register of Historic Places in Illinois
Bridges completed in 1883
Bridges in Coles County, Illinois
National Register of Historic Places in Coles County, Illinois
Pratt truss bridges in the United States
Metal bridges in the United States
1883 establishments in Illinois